Marie Stuart is a grand opera in five acts composed by Louis Niedermeyer to a libretto by Théodor Anne loosely based on events in the life of Mary, Queen of Scots. It premiered at the Théâtre de l'Académie Royale de Musique in Paris on 6 December 1844 with Rosine Stoltz in the title role.

Background and performance history

Marie Stuart was Niedermeyer's fourth opera and his second foray into the grand opera genre. Although some sources, e.g. Garo (2011), have written that the libretto is based on Friedrich Schiller's 1800 play, Mary Stuart, this provenance does not appear in the libretto published in 1845 or the synopsis published in 1844, and the opera is quite different from the play. Schiller's play depicts only the last two days in the life of Mary, Queen of Scots while the opera spans the period from 1561 to 1587 with the setting moving from France to Scotland and finally to England. Niedermeyer composed the score in less than a year, and the work premiered on 6 December 1844 at the Théâtre de l'Académie Royale de Musique with King Louis Philippe in attendance. The ballet, starring Adèle Dumilâtre, was presented as a performance attended by Mary Stuart at her palace. Like many such ballets in the golden age of grand opera, it also served a dramatic function within the opera itself. Its theme, the triumph of Esther over the fallen queen Vashti, echoes Mary Stuart's hopes that she would triumph over Queen Elizabeth.

After the premiere, Niedermeyer was made a Chevalier (Knight) of the French Legion of Honour, but Marie Stuart had only a modest success. It remained in the repertoire of the Paris Opera with some cuts to the score until 1846, after which it was largely forgotten. It was, however, revived in Stuttgart in 1877 (performed in German translation), and extracts from the work were performed by Zurich Opera at the 2002 Festival della Valle d'Itria in Italy. Several pieces from the opera were published separately and were frequently performed in concerts and recitals. The most notable of these was Marie's aria in act 1 where she bids her farewell to France, "Déjà la nuit s'avance" (also known as "Les adieux de Marie Stuart"). It was performed in recitals by both male and female singers in the 19th century and continues to be performed today. It was also published in various arrangements for solo instrument including violin, piano, and flute.

Roles

See also
Cultural depictions of Mary, Queen of Scots
Stradella, Niedermeyer's first grand opera

References
Notes

Sources
Anne, Théodore (1845). Marie Stuart: opéra en 5 actes  (libretto). C. Tresse (Paris) 
 Charlton, David, editor (2003). The Cambridge Companion to Grand Opera. Cambridge University Press. 
Fétis, François-Joseph (1864). "Niedermeyer (Louis)", Biographie universelle des musiciens et bibliographie génèrale de la musique, Volume 6, 2nd edition. Firmin-Didot
Garo, Edouard (2011), L'oeuvre de Louis Niedermeyer. Association Niedermeyer Nyon.

Further reading
Académie Royale de Musique (1844). Marie Stuart: opéra en 5 actes (synopsis). F. Malteste (Paris)

External links

Operas by Louis Niedermeyer
French-language operas
Grand operas
1844 operas
Operas
Opera world premieres at the Paris Opera
Cultural depictions of Mary, Queen of Scots
Operas set in Scotland